Alessandro Giannessi (born 30 May 1990) is a professional Italian tennis player. On 24 July 2017 he reached his highest ATP singles ranking of 84 while his best doubles ranking was 171 on 14 October 2013.

Career

Giannessi made his Grand Slam debut at the 2016 US Open (tennis) as a qualifier where he recorded his first Major win defeating Denis Kudla in five sets.

Giannessi was a singles semifinalist at the 2017 Croatia Open Umag.

At the 2021 French Open he made his debut at this Major after qualifying for the main draw with a win over Francisco Cerundolo. 

At the 2022 French Open although he lost in the third round of qualifying to Sebastian Ofner he entered the main draw as a lucky loser.

Challenger and Futures finals

Singles: 22 (9–13)

Doubles: 26 (7–19)

Singles performance timeline

References

External links
 
 

1990 births
Living people
People from La Spezia
Italian male tennis players
Sportspeople from the Province of La Spezia
21st-century Italian people